James Ruchti is an American attorney and politician serving as a member of the Idaho House of Representatives from the 29th district. Elected in November 2020, he assumed office on December 1, 2020. Ruchti had previously served in the House from 2006 to 2010.

Early life and education 
Ruchti was born and raised in Pocatello, Idaho. He earned a Bachelor of Science degree from the United States Military Academy in 1993 and a Juris Doctor from the University of Idaho College of Law in 2001.

Career 
Ruchti served in the United States Army, retiring with the rank of captain. From 1993 to 1998, he was an officer with the Military Intelligence Corps. Ruchti is a personal injury attorney in Pocatello. From 2006 to 2010, he served as a member of the Idaho House of Representatives from the 29th district. He was elected to the seat again in November 2020. He assumed office on December 1, 2020, succeeding Elaine Smith. Ruchti has written op-ed columns on Idaho politics for the Post Register.

References 

Year of birth missing (living people)
Living people
People from Pocatello, Idaho
United States Military Academy alumni
United States Army officers
University of Idaho College of Law alumni
Idaho lawyers
Democratic Party members of the Idaho House of Representatives
21st-century American politicians